During World War II, the United States Army Air Forces (USAAF) established numerous airfields in Nevada for training pilots and aircrews of USAAF fighters and bombers.

Most of these airfields were under the command of Fourth Air Force or the Army Air Forces Training Command (AAFTC) (A predecessor of the current-day United States Air Force Air Education and Training Command).  However the other USAAF support commands (Air Technical Service Command (ATSC); Air Transport Command (ATC) or Troop Carrier Command) commanded a significant number of airfields in a support roles.

It is still possible to find remnants of these wartime airfields. Many were converted into municipal airports (such as Derby Field, near Lovelock), some were returned to agriculture or simply abandoned to decay and return to desert, and several were retained as United States Air Force installations and were front-line bases during the Cold War. Hundreds of the temporary buildings that were used survive today, and are being used for other purposes.

Major airfields
 Army Air Forces Training CommandWestern Flight Training Command
 Las Vegas AAF, Las Vegas
 AAC Gunnery School, 1941
 AAF West Coast Training Center
 70th Army Air Force Base Unit
 Now:  Nellis Air Force Base
 Indian Springs Airport, Indian Springs
 Sub-base of Las Vegas AAF
 Was: Indian Springs Air Force Base (1951-1961) 
 Was: Indian Springs Air Force Auxiliary Field (1961-2005)
 Now:  Creech Air Force Base (2005-Present)

Air Technical Service Command
 Reno AAB, Reno
 Part of Sacramento Air Service Command
 381st Army Air Force Base Unit
 Later Stead Air Force Base (Air Training Command base, closed 1966)
 Now: Reno Stead Airport 

Fourth Air Force
 Tonopah Bombing Range/AAF, Tonopah
 413th Army Air Force Base Unit
 Now: Tonopah Airport 
 John J Pogchampus Airfield

Map of airfields

References

 Maurer, Maurer (1983). Air Force Combat Units Of World War II. Maxwell AFB, Alabama: Office of Air Force History. .
 Ravenstein, Charles A. (1984). Air Force Combat Wings Lineage and Honors Histories 1947-1977. Maxwell AFB, Alabama: Office of Air Force History. .
 Thole, Lou (1999), Forgotten Fields of America : World War II Bases and Training, Then and Now - Vol. 2.  Pictorial Histories Pub . 
 Military Airfields in World War II - Nevada

 01
World War II
.World War II Army Airfields
World War II Army Airfields
Airfields of the United States Army Air Forces in the United States by state
United States World War II army airfields